St Michael's Church is in the village of Wincle, Cheshire, England.  It is an active Anglican parish church in the diocese of Chester, the archdeaconry of Macclesfield and the deanery of Macclesfield.  Its benefice is combined with those of St Mary, Bosley, St Michael, North Rode, and St Saviour, Wildboarclough.  The church is recorded in the National Heritage List for England as a designated Grade II listed building.

History

The original church was built in 1647 on the site of a Neolithic burial mound.  A tower was added about 1815, and the rest of the church was rebuilt in 1882 by Edward Witts.

Architecture

The church is built in buff coursed rubble gritstone with a roof of banded grey tiles.  The tower is at the west end and the body of the church has five bays.  There are no aisles.  The tower is in three stages, with a plain west window and bell openings with louvres of Kerridge stone.  The top of the tower is battlemented.  Over the priest's door is a lintel from the older church which is dated 1647.  In the church is a font dated 1861.  The interior of the church is "unadorned".

External features

In the southwest corner of the churchyard is the war grave of a South Wales Borderers soldier of World War I.

See also

Listed buildings in Wincle

References

Churches completed in 1882
Church of England church buildings in Cheshire
Grade II listed churches in Cheshire
Gothic Revival church buildings in England
Gothic Revival architecture in Cheshire
Diocese of Chester
1647 establishments in England